Castelvecchio Museum (Italian: Museo Civico di Castelvecchio) is a museum in Verona, northern Italy, located in the eponymous medieval castle. Restoration by the architect Carlo Scarpa between 1959 and 1973 has enhanced the appearance of the building and exhibits.  Scarpa's architectural style is visible in the details for doorways, staircases, furnishings, and even fixtures designed to hold a specific piece of artwork. The renovation carefully balanced new and old, revealing the history of the original building where appropriate. Unusual at the time, this approach has now become a common approach to renovation.

Collection 
The museum displays a collection of sculpture, statues, paintings, ancient weapons, ceramics, goldworks, miniatures and some old bells.

Sculptures, mostly from the Romanesque period of Verona, include:
Sepulchre of the Sts. Sergius and Bacchus, basrelief from 1179.
"Crucifix", a 14th-century tuff work by the so-called Master of Sant'Anastasia, from the church of San Giacomo in Tomba.
"St. Cecilia and Catherina", from the same Master of St. Anastasia.
Equestrian statue of Cangrande I della Scala, coming from complex of the Scaliger Tombs.

Paintings include:
Madonna of the Quail by Pisanello
Madonna of the Rose Garden by Stefano da Verona or Michelino da Besozzo
Crucifixion and Madonna dell'Umiltà by Jacopo Bellini
Madonna with Child by Gentile Bellini
Madonna of the Oak by Girolamo dai Libri
Holy Family by Andrea Mantegna

There are also numerous paintings and frescoes from the 14th century.

Gallery

Notes

External links 

  
 Verona Tourism

 
Sculpture galleries in Italy
Art museums and galleries in Veneto
Buildings and structures in Verona
Modernist architecture in Italy
Tourist attractions in Verona
Museums in Verona